This is a list of people who have served as mayor or president of the city council of the city of Osijek, in Croatia.

Sources

Osijek
Mayors Of Osijek